Barsuki is the name of several geographical locations.

Kazakhstan
Barsuki Desert, Aktobe Region

Bryansk Oblast
As of 2012, three rural localities in Bryansk Oblast bear this name:
Barsuki, Rognedinsky District, Bryansk Oblast, a village in Sharovichsky Rural Administrative Okrug of Rognedinsky District; 
Barsuki, Surazhsky District, Bryansk Oblast, a village in Dubrovsky Rural Administrative Okrug of Surazhsky District; 
Barsuki, Zhiryatinsky District, Bryansk Oblast, a settlement in Vorobeynsky Rural Administrative Okrug of Zhiryatinsky District;

Chelyabinsk Oblast
As of 2012, one rural locality in Chelyabinsk Oblast bears this name:
Barsuki, Chelyabinsk Oblast, a village in Travnikovsky Selsoviet of Chebarkulsky District

Republic of Ingushetia 
As of 2023, one rural locality in the Republic of Ingushetia bears this name:
 Barsuki, Ingushetia, a selo in Nazranovsky District

Ivanovo Oblast
As of 2012, two rural localities in Ivanovo Oblast bear this name:
Barsuki, Kineshemsky District, Ivanovo Oblast, a village in Kineshemsky District
Barsuki, Yuryevetsky District, Ivanovo Oblast, a village in Yuryevetsky District

Kaluga Oblast
As of 2012, five rural localities in Kaluga Oblast bear this name:
Barsuki, Dzerzhinsky District, Kaluga Oblast, a village in Dzerzhinsky District
Barsuki, Kirovsky District, Kaluga Oblast, a village in Kirovsky District
Barsuki, Kuybyshevsky District, Kaluga Oblast, a village in Kuybyshevsky District
Barsuki, Mosalsky District, Kaluga Oblast, a village in Mosalsky District
Barsuki, Zhukovsky District, Kaluga Oblast, a village in Zhukovsky District

Moscow Oblast
As of 2012, three rural localities in Moscow Oblast bear this name:
Barsuki, Lukhovitsky District, Moscow Oblast, a village in Gazoprovodskoye Rural Settlement of Lukhovitsky District; 
Barsuki, Mozhaysky District, Moscow Oblast, a village in Poretskoye Rural Settlement of Mozhaysky District; 
Barsuki, Yegoryevsky District, Moscow Oblast, a village in Yurtsovskoye Rural Settlement of Yegoryevsky District;

Novgorod Oblast
As of 2012, one rural locality in Novgorod Oblast bears this name:
Barsuki, Novgorod Oblast, a village in Krasnoborskoye Settlement of Kholmsky District

Pskov Oblast
As of 2012, seven rural localities in Pskov Oblast bear this name:
Barsuki, Loknyansky District, Pskov Oblast, a village in Loknyansky District
Barsuki (Lekhovskaya Rural Settlement), Nevelsky District, Pskov Oblast, a village in Nevelsky District; municipally, a part of Lekhovskaya Rural Settlement of that district
Barsuki (Lobkovskaya Rural Settlement), Nevelsky District, Pskov Oblast, a village in Nevelsky District; municipally, a part of Lobkovskaya Rural Settlement of that district
Barsuki, Novorzhevsky District, Pskov Oblast, a village in Novorzhevsky District
Barsuki, Opochetsky District, Pskov Oblast, a village in Opochetsky District
Barsuki (Idritsa Urban Settlement), Sebezhsky District, Pskov Oblast, a village in Sebezhsky District; municipally, a part of Idritsa Urban Settlement of that district
Barsuki (Sebezh Urban Settlement), Sebezhsky District, Pskov Oblast, a village in Sebezhsky District; municipally, a part of Sebezh Urban Settlement of that district

Ryazan Oblast
As of 2012, one rural locality in Ryazan Oblast bears this name:
Barsuki, Ryazan Oblast, a village in Koldyukovsky Rural Okrug of Kasimovsky District

Smolensk Oblast
As of 2012, eleven rural localities in Smolensk Oblast bear this name:
Barsuki, Dorogobuzhsky District, Smolensk Oblast, a village in Ushakovskoye Rural Settlement of Dorogobuzhsky District
Barsuki, Karmanovskoye Rural Settlement, Gagarinsky District, Smolensk Oblast, a village in Karmanovskoye Rural Settlement of Gagarinsky District
Barsuki, Samuylovskoye Rural Settlement, Gagarinsky District, Smolensk Oblast, a village in Samuylovskoye Rural Settlement of Gagarinsky District
Barsuki, Monastyrshchinsky District, Smolensk Oblast, a village in Barsukovskoye Rural Settlement of Monastyrshchinsky District
Barsuki, Ivanovskoye Rural Settlement, Pochinkovsky District, Smolensk Oblast, a village in Ivanovskoye Rural Settlement of Pochinkovsky District
Barsuki, Stodolishchenskoye Rural Settlement, Pochinkovsky District, Smolensk Oblast, a village in Stodolishchenskoye Rural Settlement of Pochinkovsky District
Barsuki, Roslavlsky District, Smolensk Oblast, a village in Kostyrevskoye Rural Settlement of Roslavlsky District
Barsuki, Safonovsky District, Smolensk Oblast, a village in Ignatkovskoye Rural Settlement of Safonovsky District
Barsuki, Ugransky District, Smolensk Oblast, a village in Vskhodskoye Rural Settlement of Ugransky District
Barsuki, Vyazemsky District, Smolensk Oblast, a village in Khmelitskoye Rural Settlement of Vyazemsky District
Barsuki, Yelninsky District, Smolensk Oblast, a village in Mutishchenskoye Rural Settlement of Yelninsky District

Tula Oblast
As of 2012, four rural localities in Tula Oblast bear this name:
Barsuki, Barsukovsky Rural Okrug, Leninsky District, Tula Oblast, a settlement in Barsukovsky Rural Okrug of Leninsky District
Barsuki, Khrushchevsky Rural Okrug, Leninsky District, Tula Oblast, a village in Khrushchevsky Rural Okrug of Leninsky District
Barsuki, Venyovsky District, Tula Oblast, a village in Mordvessky Rural Okrug of Venyovsky District
Barsuki, Yasnogorsky District, Tula Oblast, a village in Arkhangelskaya Rural Territory of Yasnogorsky District

Tver Oblast
As of 2012, five rural localities in Tver Oblast bear this name:
Barsuki, Maksatikhinsky District, Tver Oblast, a village in Zarechenskoye Rural Settlement of Maksatikhinsky District
Barsuki, Torzhoksky District, Tver Oblast, a village in Vysokovskoye Rural Settlement of Torzhoksky District
Barsuki, Zapadnodvinsky District, Tver Oblast, a village in Ilyinskoye Rural Settlement of Zapadnodvinsky District
Barsuki, Zharkovskoye Rural Settlement, Zharkovsky District, Tver Oblast, a village in Zharkovskoye Rural Settlement of Zharkovsky District
Barsuki, Zharkovsky Urban Settlement, Zharkovsky District, Tver Oblast, a settlement under the administrative jurisdiction of Zharkovsky Urban Settlement in Zharkovsky District

Tyumen Oblast
As of 2012, one rural locality in Tyumen Oblast bears this name:
Barsuki, Tyumen Oblast, a village in Zonovsky Rural Okrug of Yurginsky District

Vladimir Oblast
As of 2012, two rural localities in Vladimir Oblast bear this name:
Barsuki, Gus-Khrustalny District, Vladimir Oblast, a village in Gus-Khrustalny District
Barsuki, Melenkovsky District, Vladimir Oblast, a village in Melenkovsky District